Stephanie Perkins is an American author, known for her books Anna and the French Kiss, Lola and the Boy Next Door, The New York Times bestseller Isla and the Happily Ever After and There's Someone Inside Your House, the latter of which was adapted into a film of the same name by Netflix.

Career
Perkins was born in South Carolina. During her formative years, she lived in Arizona with her family, and attended universities in California and Georgia. After spending a year living in San Francisco, she moved away to live with her husband, Jarrod Perkins in Asheville, North Carolina.

Bibliography

Fiction
Anna and the French Kiss (2010) 
Lola and the Boy Next Door (2011)    
Isla and the Happily Ever After (2014)
There's Someone Inside Your House (2017)
The Woods Are Always Watching (2021)

Anthologies
My True Love Gave To Me: Twelve Holiday Stories (2014)
Summer Days and Summer Nights: Twelve Love Stories (2016)

Awards
Listen Up Award (2012, for Lola and the Boy Next Door)
YALSA's Best Fiction for Young Adults (2012, Lola and the Boy Next Door)

References

Living people
Writers from Asheville, North Carolina
21st-century American novelists
American thriller writers
American fantasy writers
American horror novelists
American women novelists
American women short story writers
American young adult novelists
21st-century American women writers
Women writers of young adult literature
21st-century American short story writers
Year of birth missing (living people)
Women horror writers